Surplus economics is the study of economics based upon the concept that economies operate on the basis of the production of a surplus over basic needs.

Economic Surplus
By economic surplus is meant all production which is not essential for the continuance of existence. That is to say, all production about which there is a choice as to whether or not it is produced. The economic surplus begins when an economy is first able to produce more than it needs to survive, a surplus to its essentials.

Alternative definitions are:

 The difference between the value of a society's annual product and its socially necessary cost of production. (Davis, p.1)
 The range of economic freedom at its [society's] disposal, extent able to engage in socially discretionary spending that satisfies more than the basic needs of its producers. (Dawson & Foster in Davis, p.45)
 Income minus essential consumption requirements. (Lippit in Davis p.81)
 The difference between what a society can produce and what a society must produce to reproduce itself. (Standfield in Davis, p.131)

See also
 Economic surplus
 Scarcity rent
 Georgism

References
 Monopoly capital: an essay on the American economic and social order, Paul A. Baran and Paul M. Sweezy
 The Economic surplus in advanced economies, John B. Davis (Ed)
 The economic surplus and neo-Marxism, Ron J. Stanfield

Further reading
 What is Surplus Economics? 

Schools of economic thought